Willie McQueen was a Scottish international lawn and indoor and indoor bowler.

Bowls career
He won a silver medal in the triples, a silver medal in the fours and a bronze medal in the team event (Leonard Trophy) at the 1980 World Outdoor Bowls Championship in Melbourne. He was capped 69 times outdoors for Scotland from 1967 until 1989.

Awards
McQueen bowled indoors for the Blantyre Miners’ Welfare Indoor Bowling Club and was posthumously inducted into the Scottish Indoor Bowls Hall of Fame in 2016.

He was given the nickname 'Machine McQueen' by the legendary David Bryant due to his resilience on the bowling greens.

References

Scottish male bowls players
Year of birth missing
Year of death missing